The World Archery Rankings is a ranking system developed by the World Archery Federation for international competitive archery. It is calculated using a points system and published following major World Archery tournaments.

The ranking system was first developed in 2001, and calculation method updated in 2010. At present, rankings are maintained for:
 Recurve archery: Men's Individual, Women's Individual, Men's Team, Women's Team, Mixed Team
 Compound archery: Men's Individual, Women's Individual, Men's Team, Women's Team, Mixed Team
 Para-archery: Recurve Men W2, Recurve Men Standing, Compound Men W1, Compound Men Open, Recurve Women W2, Recurve Women Standing, Compound Women Open, Visually Impaired Open
 Nations: National rankings based on all disciplines

From 2006, rankings were calculated for Field Archery, but since 2012 are no longer maintained.

Calculation

Each archer or team earns a ranking score for each competition. The ranking scores are calculated through a combination of the ranking factor of the tournament ("Ranking Factor") and points based on the competitor's final position in the competition ("Ranking Score"). The archer's four highest ranking scores are then combined to form their total score ("Added Ranking Score"), which forms the basis of the ranking list.

Ranking factor
Only results achieved at official ranking events can count towards the overall rankings. These events include the major World Archery Federation tournaments (Olympics, World Archery Championships, World Cup), and other international, regional and national events that have applied and been approved for ranking status.

The tournament ranking factor is calculated on the basis of three sub-factors, Quality, Quantity and Period, which are multiplied together to produce the overall tournament factor. The factor can vary between disciplines at the same event (e.g., the recurve and compound disciplines at the World Championships may have different ranking factors).

For instance, the ranking factor of a tournament for individuals with 60 archers, of whom 10 are in the top 50, that took place 18 months ago, would be:
2.5 ("Quality": 9–12 top 50 archers) ×
0.9 ("Quantity": 33–64 archers) ×
0.5 ("Period": other tournament 12–24 months ago) = 
1.125

Quality
The Quality sub-factor takes into account the level of competition at the tournament. A score is assigned based on the prestige of the event, for the major World Archery Federation tournaments, and the number of top archers or teams at other competitions (defined as individuals ranked in the top 50 or teams ranked in the top 16). The quality factor points are assigned as follows:

Individual

Team

Quantity
The Quantity sub-factor assigns a score based on the number of archers competing as follows:

Individual

Team

Period
The Period sub-factor is dependent on when the competition took place, allowing the ranking factor to emphasise the most recent tournaments as follows:

Ranking Points

Ranking Points are awarded based on the team or competitor's final position at the competition. This is then multiplied by the Ranking Factor to produce the overall Ranking Score for that team or competitor at that tournament. For instance, an archer who finished 4th in the competition used in the example above would receive the following Ranking Score:

1.125 ("Ranking Factor") x

12 ("Ranking Points": 4th place) =

13.5

A team or competitor's best four Ranking Scores are then combined to produce the Added Ranking Score, which forms the basis of the  rankings list. No more than two Ranking Scores whose period factor is lower than 1 may be used to calculate the Added Ranking Score.

Ranking Points are awarded as follows:

Individual

Team

Current Rankings
o: Current Olympic champion (Compound discipline and mixed team events are not competed at the Olympics)
wc: Current World champion
cup: Current World Cup Stage winner (Team events, apart from mixed team, are not competed at the World Cup final)
cupf: Current World Cup Final Stage winner

Recurve

Men's individual recurve 
Rankings at 10 December 2021

|

Women's individual recurve 
Rankings at 10 December 2021

|-
|

Men's team recurve 
Rankings at 2 October 2021

|

Women's team recurve 
Rankings at 2 October 2021

|

Mixed team recurve 
Rankings at 2 October 2021

|
|-
|

Compound

Men's individual compound 
Rankings at 2 october 2021

|

Women's individual compound 
Rankings at 2 october 2021

|-
|

Men's team compound 
Rankings at 2 October 2021

|

Women's team compound 
Rankings at 2 october 2021

|

Mixed team compound 
Rankings at 2 October 2021

|
|-
|

Number one ranked archers

The following archers have achieved the number one individual position since the inception of the rankings in 2001:

Recurve

Men

Women

Compound

Men

Women

References

World Archery Federation
Sports world rankings
Archery